The  2013 AFF U-19 Youth Championship was held from 9 September to 22 September 2013, hosted by Indonesia. 11 members of the ASEAN Football Federation were divided into two groups.

Australia, originally drawn in Group A, withdrew on 8 September 2013, citing lack of preparations. Indonesia won the tournament after defeating unbeaten team, Vietnam, through a penalty shoot-out. This was also their first title since the tournament was held in 2002.

Venues

Standings and results
All times are local (UTC+07:00)

Group A

Group B

Knockout stage

Semi-finals

Third place play-off

Final

Winner

Goalscorers
6 goals
 Nguyễn Văn Toàn

5 goals
 Evan Dimas Darmono
 Adelino Trindade

4 goals
 Ilham Udin Armaiyn

3 goals

 Nub Tola
 Lembo Saysana
 Muhammad Arif Mohamed Anwar
 Muhammad Jafri
 Nyein Chan Aung
 Muhammad Hazim Faiz
 Tanadol Jansawang
 Frangcyatma Alves

2 goals

 Va Bottroi
 Muchlis Hadi Ning Syaifulloh
 Phithack Kongmathilath
 Soukchinda Natphasouk
 Souksavanh Somsanith
 Aung Thu
 Maung Maung Soe
 Yan Naing Oo
 Nikko Benedicto
 Chaiyawat Buran
 Kullachat Jeentanorm
 Ratchanon Phunklai
 Supravee Miprathang
 Nguyen Cong Phuong
 Pham Trum Tinh

1 goal

 Faiq Jefri Bolkiah
 Hoy Phallin
 Moung Makara
 Neth Veasna
 Sok Samnang
 Alqomar Tehupelasury
 Muhammad Hargianto
 Putu Gede Juni Antara
 Armisay Kettavong
 Bounthavy Sipasong
 Muhammad Alif Haikal
 Nur Shamie Iszuan Amin
 Thanabalan Nadarajah
 Naung Naung Latt
 Saw Si I
 Si Thu Aung
 Than Paing
 Arnel Amita
 Junell Bautista
 Jeffrey Lightfoot
 Mahathir Azeman
 Muhammad Muhelmy
 Atthawit Sukchuai
 Chaowat Veerachart
 Chenrop Samphodi
 Kandanai Thawornsak
 Piyapong Homkhajon
 Carlos Magno
 Januario Jesus
 Jose Almeida
 Marcos Gusmao
 Nataniel de Jesus Reis
 Lam Ti Phong
 Nguyen Minh Thai
 Nguyen Phong Hong Duy
 Pham Duc Huy
 Phan Thanh Hau
 Truong Van Thiet

References

External links
 AFF official website

Under
2013
2013
2013 in Indonesian football
2013 in youth association football